Vera Martha Winitzky de Spinadel (August 22, 1929 – January 26, 2017 in Buenos Aires, Argentina) was an Argentine mathematician. She was the first woman to gain a PhD in mathematics at the University of Buenos Aires, Argentina, in 1958. Between 2010 and 2017, she was full Emeritus Professor in the Faculty of Architecture, Design and Urban Planning of the University of Buenos Aires.  In 1995, she was named Director of the Centre of Mathematics and Design.  In April 2005 she inaugurated the Laboratory of Mathematics & Design, University Campus in Buenos Aires. From 1998 to her death she was the President of the International Mathematics and Design Association, which organizes international congresses every 3 years and publishes a Journal of Mathematics & Design. She was the author of more than 10 books and published more than 100 research papers.
Spinadel was a leader in the field of metallic mean and in the development of the classical Golden Ratio and got wide international recognition.

Books 
From the Golden Mean to Chaos, Editorial Nueva Librería, Buenos Aires, Argentina, 260 pp. , 1998
The Metallic Means and Design, Nexus II: Architecture and Mathematics. Editor: Kim Williams. Edizioni dell’Erba, 1998
Del Número de Oro al Caos. Editorial Nobuko S. A., 2003
Geometría Fractal, in collaboration with Jorge G. Perera and Jorge H. Perera, with CD with Images. Editorial Nobuko S. A., 2003
Geometría Fractal, with Jorge G. Perera & Jorge H. Perera, Editorial Nueva Librería, 2nd edition, 2007
Cálculo Superior, 1st. Editorial Nueva Librería, 2009.
From the Golden Mean to Chaos, 3rd Edition, Editorial Nueva Librería, Junio 2010. 
Forma y matemática: La familia de Números Metálicos en Diseño, 1st. Edition. Buenos Aires: Nobuko. Ediciones FADU, Serie Difusión 22. , 2011
Forma y matemática II: Fractales y forma, 1st. Edition. Buenos Aires: Nobuko. Ediciones FADU, Serie Difusión 24. , 2012

Papers 

 "Sistemas Estructurados y Creatividad", Keynote Speaker Open Lecture for the International Mathematics & Design Conference MyD-95, October 23–27, 1995, FADU, Buenos Aires, Argentina. Proc. , 1996
 "La familia de números metálicos en Diseño". Primer Seminario Nacional de Gráfica Digital, Sesión de Morfología y Matemática, FADU, UBA, 11-13 de junio de 1997. Volumen II,  
 "On Characterization of the Onset to Chaos", Chaos, Solitons and Fractals 8 (10): 1631–1643, 1997
 "New Smarandache sequences", Proceedings of the First International Conference on Smarandache type Notions in Number Theory, ed. C. Dumitrescu & V. Seleacu, University of Craiova, 21–24 August 1997, American Research Press, Lupton, 1997, pp. 81–116
 "Una nueva familia de números", Anales de la Sociedad Científica Argentina 228 ( 1): 101–107, 1998
 "Triangulature in Andrea Palladio", Nexus Network Journal, Architecture and Mathematics on line
 "A new family of irrational numbers with curious properties", Humanistic Mathematics Network Journal 19: 33–37, marzo 1999
 "The Metallic Means family and multifractal spectra", Nonlinear Analysis 36: 721–745, 1999
 "The Golden Mean and its many relatives", First Interdisciplinary Conference of The International Society of the Arts, Mathematics and Architecture ISAMA 99, San Sebastián, Spain, 7–11 June 1999. Editors: Nathaniel A. Friedman and Javier Barrallo. , pp. 453–460
"The family of Metallic Means", Visual Mathematics I ( 3) 1999
 "The family of Metallic Means", Symmetry: Culture and Science. The Quarterly International Society for the Interdisciplinary Study of Symmetry (ISIS-Symmetry) 10 ( 3-4): 317–338, 1999
 "The Metallic Means family and Renormalization Group Techniques", Proceedings of the Steklov Institute of Mathematics, Suppl. 1, 2000, pp. S194-S209
 "Fracciones continuas y la teoría de las proporciones de Palladio", ICVA Primer Congreso Virtual de Arquitectura, December 1999 to January 2000 
 "Half-regular Continued Fraction Expansions and Design", Journal of Mathematics & Design 1 ( 1) marzo 2001
 "Continued Fraction Expansions and Design", The Proceedings of Mathematics & Design 2001, The Third International Conference, 3 a 5 de julio de 2001, The School of Architecture & Building, The School of Computing & Mathematics, Deakin University, Geelong, Australia, 
 "Geometric representation of purely periodic Metallic Means", with Martín L. Benarroch, Walter L. Geler and Stella M. Sirianni, Journal of Mathematics & Design 1 ( 2) summer 2001, 
 "The metallic means family and forbidden symmetries", International Mathematical Journal 2 (3): 279–288, 2002
 "The Set of Silver Integers", Journal of Mathematics & Design 2 ( 1) 2002
 "Symmetry Groups in Mathematics, Architecture and Art", Special issue of the papers presented at the Matomium Euro-Workshop 2002. Editó Department of Architecture Sint-Lucas, Brusel, Belgic. Symmetry: Art and Science 2 (new serie, 1-4): 385–403, 2002, 
 "Geometría Fractal y Geometría Euclidiana", Revista de Educación y Pedagogía, Medellín, Colombia, Universidad de Antioquia, Facultad de Educación, vol. XV, Nro. 35, pp. 83–93, January–April 2003, 
 "Number theory and Art", ISAMA-Bridges 2003. Conference Proceedings of Meeting Alhambra, University of Granada, Granada, España. Editores: Javier Barrallo, Nathaniel Friedman, Reza Sarhangi, Carlo Séquin, José Martínez, Juan A. Maldonado. . pp. 415–423, 2003
 "La familia de Números Metálicos", Cuadernos del Cimbage, Instituto de Investigaciones en Estadística y Matemática Actuarial, Facultad de Ciencias Económicas, UBA, No. 6, pp. 17–45, Mai 2004
 "Generalized Silver Means Subfamily", Journal of Mathematics & Design 6 ( 1): 53–59, 2007. Editorial Nueva Librería 
 "Orígenes Históricos del Número de Plata y sus Applicaciones en Arquitectura", Journal of Mathematics & Design 6 ( 1): 93–99, 2007. Editorial Nueva Librería 
 "Conceptos fractales aplicados al Diseño", Actas del Primer Congreso Internacional de Matemáticas en Ingeniería y Arquitectura, Universidad Politécnica de Madrid, Mai 30 to June 2007, pp. 137–146,  
 "Applicaciones de Geometría Fractal en el campo de la construcción", Actas del Primer Congreso Internacional de Matemáticas en Ingeniería y Arquitectura, Universidad Politécnica de Madrid, Mai 30 to June 2007, pp. 215–220, 
 "Espirales asociadas a los Números Metálicos", in collaboration with Antonia Redondo Buitrago, 5th Mathematics & Design International Conference, Blumenau, Brasil, July 1–4, 2007, 
 "Golden and Metallic Means in modern Mathematics and Physics", Proceedings of the 13th International Conference on Geometry and Graphics, August 4–8, 2008, .
 "On plastic numbers in the plane", in collaboration with Antonia Redondo Buitrago, Proceedings of the 13th International Conference on Geometry and Graphics, August 4–8 de 2008, .
 "Visualización y tecnología", Cuadernos del Cimbage, Instituto de Investigaciones en Estadística y Matemática Actuarial, Facultad de Ciencias Económicas, UBA, No. 10, pp. 1–16, Mai 2008.
 "Characterization of the onset to chaos in Economy", Proceedings of the Seventh All-Russian Conference on Financial and Actuarial Mathematics and Related Fields FAM´2008, Part 2, pp. 250–265, .
 "Intersection of Mathematics & Arts", Proceedings of the Seventh All-Russian Conference on Financial and Actuarial Mathematics and Related Fields FAM´2008, Part 2, pp. 265– 284, .
 "Herramientas matemáticas para la arquitectura y el diseño", in collaboration with Hernán S. Nottoli. 1st. Edition – Buenos Aires Nobuko October 2008, .
 "Dynamic Geometrical Constructions based on the Golden Mean", in collaboration with Antonia Redondo Buitrago, Slovak Journal for Geometry and Graphics, Vol. 5, No. 10, pp. 27–39, 2008, .
 "Characterization of the onset to Chaos in Economy", Cuadernos del Cimbage, Instituto de Investigaciones en Estadística y Matemática Actuarial, Facultad de Ciencias Económicas, UBA, No. 11, pp. 25–38,  (print version).  (on line version), 2009.
 "La proporción: arte y matemáticas", in collaboration with J. Jiménez (coord.), O. J. Abdounur, E. Badillo, S. Balbás, F. Corbalán, J. M. Dos Santos, M. Edo, J. A. García Cruz and A. Masip. Editorial GRAO, Barcelona, Spain, . 1ra. Edition November 2009.
 "Towards van der Laan´s Plastic Number in the Plane", in collaboration with Antonia Redondo Buitrago, Journal for Geometry and Graphics, Vol. 13, Number 2, pp. 163–175, 2009, .
 "Sobre los sistemas de proporciones áureo y plástico y sus generalizaciones", in collaboration with Antonia Redondo Buitrago, Journal of Mathematics & Design, Vol. 9, Number 1, pp. 15–34, 2009, .
 "Arte fractal", AREA Agenda de reflexión en Arquitectura, Diseño y Urbanismo, No. 15, pp. 89–90. Octubre 2009, .
 "Nuevas propiedades de la Familia de Números Metálicos", in collaboration with Antonia Redondo Buitrago. Special Edition with the Proceedings of M&D-2007 5th International Conference of Mathematics & Design, Journal of Mathematics & Design, vol. 7, No. 1, pp. 53–65.
 "Paper folding constructions to the Mean Values of van der Laan and Rosenbusch", in collaboration with Gunter Weiss, International Conference on Geometry and Graphics, 2010, Kyoto, Japan. Proceedings publish in DVD, .
 "Use of the powers of the members of the Metallic Means Family in artistic  Design", 10th International Conference APLIMAT 2011, Faculty of Mechanical Engineering, Slovak University of Technology in Bratislava, section: Mathematics & Art. February 1–4, 2011.
 "Sistemas de proporciones generalizados: aplicaciones", in collaboration with Antonia Redondo Buitrago. Edition especial con los Proceedings de M&D-2010 6th International Conference of Mathematics & Design, Journal of Mathematics & Design, vol. 10, No. 1, pp. 35–43.
 "Remarks to classical cubic problems and the mean values of van der Laan and Rosenbusch", in collaboration with Gunter Weiss. Edition especial con los Proceedings de M&D-2010 6th International Conference of Mathematics & Design, Journal of Mathematics & Design, vol. 10, No. 1, pp. 43–51.
 "Fractal art and coloring algorithms", Experience-centered Approach and Visuality in The Education of Mathematics and Physics, pp. 221–222, 2012.
 "Generalizing the Golden Spiral", in collaboration with Antonia Redondo Buitrago. Journal of Mathematics & Design, vol. 11, No. 1, pp. 109–117, 2012.
 "Fractal Geometry and Design", Summer School "Structure – Sculpture" – Rebuilding ULM Pavilion, FADU, UBA. Journal of Mathematics & Design, vol. 11, No. 1, pp. 141–151, 2012.
 "The Metallic Means Family ", Summer School "Structure – Sculpture" – Rebuilding ULM Pavilion, FADU, UBA. Journal of Mathematics & Design, vol. 11, No. 1, pp. 151–159, 2012.
 "Del Número de Oro al caos", 2nd. Edition. Editorial Nueva Librería, Buenos Aires. , 2013.
 "Visualización y tecnología aplicados al Diseño", 8o. Encuentro de Docentes de Matemática en carreras de Arquitectura y Diseño de Universidades Nacionales del Mercosur, August 14–16, 2013, Facultad de Arquitectura, Urbanismo y Diseño, Universidad Nacional de San Juan,  San Juan Argentina. Digital publication. .
 "From George Odom to a new system of Metallic Means", in collaboration with Gunter Weiss, VII Conferencia Internacional de Matemática y Diseño M&D-2013 (02-06 Septiembre 2013), Facultad de Arquitectura y Urbanismo, Universidad Nacional de Tucumán, San Miguel de Tucumán, Argentina. Proceedings publish in vol. 13 Journal of Mathematics & Design, pp. 71–86, 2014.
 "Cordovan spirals", in collaboration with Antonia Redondo Buitrago, VII Conferencia Internacional de Matemática y Diseño M&D-2013 (02-06 Septiembre 2013), Facultad de Arquitectura y Urbanismo, Universidad Nacional de Tucumán, San Miguel de Tucumán, Argentina. Proceedings publish vol. 13 Journal of Mathematics & Design, pp. 124–145, 2014.
 "Bi-Arc spirals in Minkowski planes", in collaboration with Gunter Weiss. Proceedings of the 16th International Conference on Geometry and Graphics ICGG 2014, Innsbruck (04-8 August 2014), Eds. Hans-Peter Schröder and Manfred Hosty, Innsbruck University Press, pp- 115-120, 2014.
 "Generalized Metallic Means Family". Proceedings of the 16th International Conference on Geometry and Graphics ICGG 2014, Innsbruck (04-8 August 2014), Eds. Hans-Peter Schröder and Manfred Hosty, Innsbruck University Press, pp- 459-465, 2014.

Awards 
 Gold medal 30º university teaching UBA 
2010: Full Emeritus Professor UBA

References

External links 

Vera W. de Spinadel. "Intersections of mathematics and arts" (in Wikiznanie English)
Stakhov A.P. "Metallic Means" by Vera Spinadel, Russian
The family of Metallic Means 
Nexus Network Journal 
ScienceDirect 

1929 births
2017 deaths
University of Buenos Aires alumni
Academic staff of the University of Buenos Aires
Argentine women mathematicians
Argentine mathematicians
Applied mathematicians